Purilactis Group is a heterogeneous group of volcanic, volcano-sedimentary and formations of Cretaceous to Eocene age in Salar de Atacama basin, northern Chile. The group has a stratigraphic thickness of more than 6000 m. The group overlies basement rocks of Late Paleozoic age. The north-south El Bordo Escarpment of Cordillera Domeyko contain the main outcrops of the group. The group has been difficult to date in detail since it hosts few fossils and dateable minerals. The sediments of the group deposited when volcanism in the area was mainly occurring to the west of it, rather than to east as in the present-day. In geological terms this qualifies the basin as a back-arc basin.

From top to bottom, the main units (formations) of the group outlined by Mpodozis and co-worders in 1999 are: 

Cerro Puntiagudo Strata
Loma Amarilla Strata
"Orange" Unit
Cerro Totola Strata
Barros Arana Strata
Purilactis Formation
Río Grande Member
Serilao Member
Vizcachita Member
Licán Member
Limón Verde Member
Tonel Formation

Tonel Formation is separated from Purilactis Formation by a fault, while the remaining first-order units are separated from each other by disconformities. The Tonel Formation exhibit at some localities diapirism in its gypsum layers. Tectonic movements have tilted the northern part of Purilactis Group into an near-vertical position with the stratigraphically higher parts being located in the east. Other tectonic movements have  thrust the older Paleozoic basement over the top of the southern part of the Purilactis Group. These movements account to a phase of tectonic inversion beloning to the "Incaic Phase" of the Andean orogeny.

References 

Geologic groups of South America
Geologic formations of Chile
Upper Cretaceous Series of South America
Cretaceous Chile
Paleocene Series of South America
Paleogene Chile
Eocene Series of South America
Geology of Antofagasta Region